Kirklees Council is the local authority providing most local government services for the borough of Kirklees in West Yorkshire, England. It is a metropolitan district council and one of five constituent councils of the West Yorkshire Combined Authority.

History

The West Riding County Council lead up until Kirklees Council was established in 1974 by the Local Government Act 1972, with the first elections being held in advance in 1973.

The council was initially a second-tier authority, with West Yorkshire County Council providing many key services. However, the metropolitan county councils were abolished by the Local Government Act 1985, and so in 1986 Kirklees Council took over responsibility for most of these functions within the borough.

Policing, fire services and public transport continued to be run on a county-wide basis by councillors from all five West Yorkshire boroughs. In 2012 responsibility for policing was transferred to the directly-elected West Yorkshire Police and Crime Commissioner, and in 2014 responsibility for public transport was transferred to the West Yorkshire Combined Authority. The members of Kirklees Council elect one member of the combined authority.

Since the council's inception it has been controlled by both Labour and the Conservatives at times. From 1999 to 2018 the council was under no overall control as no political party held a majority of seats. Labour gained overall control of the council in 2018 but lost its majority again in late 2020 when three councillors resigned from the party. In the local elections of 2022, the Labour Party regained control of the Council.

In May 2020, Cllr Joshua Sheard (Conservative) was elected for the first time to represent the council ward of Birstall and Birkenshaw. At the age of 19 years old Cllr. Sheard became the youngest councillor to be elected to Kirklees council in its 47 year history.

'New Council' 
Following several years of funding cuts from national government, in 2016 the council started transitioning to a different service model which the cabinet calls being a New Council.  The stated aim is to focus the reduced resources on services that only the council can provide, particularly those supporting vulnerable people, while encouraging communities to do more for themselves.

Leadership challenge

Shortly after the 2016 local elections, Labour councillors initially decided to replace incumbent council leader David Sheard with Shabir Pandor.

Pandor was nominated to become leader at the council's AGM, but his nomination fell by 33 votes to 31. Sheard and three other Labour councillors Scott, Turner & Hughes did not attend the meeting and councillors from all other parties voted against Pandor. With no leader, the council was run temporarily by the Chief Executive.

Pandor eventually resigned as Labour group leader. Sheard was re-elected as leader of the council and appointed Pandor as his deputy. Pandor was subsequently elected leader of the council in 2018.

'Ratesgate' scandal

In June 2016 the Huddersfield Daily Examiner exposed several councillors who had failed to pay their Council Tax. Five serving councillors, four Labour and one Conservative, had been issued with court claims after previously receiving reminder letters.

Two councillors who had denied the allegations, Deputy Leader Jean Calvert and Amanda Pinnock, were suspended by the Labour Party. It was the second time in as many years that Calvert had failed to pay her Council Tax when it was due, and Pinnock had accused the Examiner of racism. All councillors subsequently paid their debts before facing the court.

Failings in children's services 
In late 2016 Ofsted inspected Kirklees Council's services for vulnerable children and judged them to be inadequate. In response, Education Secretary Justine Greening appointed Eleanor Brazil as Children's Services Commissioner to make recommendations for improvement.

In her report published following the 2017 general election, Ms Brazil found that Kirklees did not have the leadership or management capacity to achieve the required standard. She recommended that Kirklees enter a formal partnership with Leeds City Council, a good neighbouring local authority. The Director of Children's Services in Leeds, Steve Walker, took overall responsibility for services in Kirklees.

In June 2019 Ofsted conducted another inspection and found all aspects of children's services still required improvement to be good.

Elections

Electoral arrangements

The council is composed of 69 councillors, three for each of the district's 23 wards. Elections are held three years out of four, on the first Thursday of May. One third of the councillors are elected, for a four-year term, in each election.

Exceptions to this include by-elections and ward boundary changes. In 2004 the wards were redrawn, so there was a general election of the entire council. The electorate were given three votes each to elect three councillors for each ward. The candidate with the most votes was elected for the standard four-year term, the candidate with the second highest number of votes was elected for three years and the candidate with the third highest number of votes was elected for two years; therefore the next election for their seat was held in 2006.

Political history

All three of the United Kingdom's main political parties: the Labour Party, the Conservatives and Liberal Democrats have had strong representation on the council. Each of the parties has formed the largest group on the council at some point. From 1999 until 2018, no single party had a majority.

Each of these parties has wards where they currently hold all the seats with a comfortable majority of votes at recent elections:
Conservatives: Birstall & Birkenshaw, Kirkburton, Liversedge & Gomersal and Mirfield.
Labour: Ashbrow, Batley East, Batley West, Crosland Moor & Netherton, Dalton, Heckmondwike, Dewsbury West, Dewsbury South and Greenhead.
Liberal Democrats: Cleckheaton.

The other wards may be seen as marginal, with different parties capturing them in different years.

The Green Party has been represented on the council since 1996, when they won a seat in the Newsome ward. Since then, the ward has consistently elected Green Party councillors.

The British National Party had a councillor elected in Heckmondwike ward in 2004, and then gained two more seats in 2006. By 2010, they had lost all of their seats and the party no longer stands in local elections.

In 2006 a Save Huddersfield NHS group was formed to campaign against plans to move medical services from Huddersfield Royal Infirmary to Halifax. The group fielded three candidates, including a local general practitioner who gained a seat in the Crosland Moor and Netherton ward. The councillor was not re-elected in 2010.

In 2017 the Heavy Woollen District Independents started to compete in elections in that area. They had their first councillor elected in Dewsbury East ward in 2019.

Current political make-up
The council is currently run by a majority Labour Party administration.

The political make-up of the council is as follows:

Decision making
The council uses executive arrangements. Councillors elect a leader, who appoints other members of the cabinet.

Local committees 
The council established Area Committees for councillors representing groups of wards to meet in their localities. In 2014 the wards were regrouped into four larger District Committees with the prospect of greater devolution of decision making from the Executive. However, in 2017 the District Committees were not re-established, and since then individual councillors have been allocated budgets instead.

Mayor
Councillors appoint a chairman annually, who serves as the Mayor of Kirklees. The mayor represents the council at civic engagements and supports the work of their designated charity.

References

Metropolitan district councils of England
Local authorities in West Yorkshire
Leader and cabinet executives
Local education authorities in England
Billing authorities in England
1974 establishments in England
Politics of Kirklees